Stylodipus is a genus of rodent in the family Dipodidae. It contains the following species:
 Andrews's three-toed jerboa (Stylodipus andrewsi)
 Mongolian three-toed jerboa (Stylodipus sungorus)
 Thick-tailed three-toed jerboa (Stylodipus telum)

References

 
Dipodidae
Rodent genera
Taxonomy articles created by Polbot
Taxa named by Glover Morrill Allen